Hydrocleys nymphoides, the waterpoppy or water-poppy, is an aquatic plant species in the Alismataceae. It is widespread across South America, Central America, Puerto Rico, Trinidad and the Netherlands Antilles. It is cultivated in many places for used in decorative ponds and artificial aquatic habitats, and naturalized in Australia, New Zealand, South Africa, Fiji, New Caledonia, French Polynesia, Florida, Louisiana and Texas.

Gallery

References

External links
Missouri Botanical Garden, Plant Finder, Gardening Help, water poppy
North Carolina State University Cooperative Extension

Alismataceae
Freshwater plants
Plants described in 1806
Flora of the Caribbean
Flora of Mexico
Flora of Central America
Flora of South America
Taxa named by Alexander von Humboldt
Taxa named by Aimé Bonpland
Flora without expected TNC conservation status